Martin J. Beck (January 2, 1900 – June 15, 1968) was an American multi-sport athlete, playing both American football and baseball. He played as a halfback for the Akron Pros / Indians of the National Football League (NFL) between 1921 and 1926.

References

People from New York (state)
Players of American football from New York (state)
American football running backs
1900 births
1968 deaths
Fordham Preparatory School alumni